The 2019 Algerian Cup Final was the 55th final of the Algerian Cup. The final took place on June 8, 2019, at Mustapha Tchaker Stadium in Blida with kick-off at 17:00 between CR Belouizdad and JSM Béjaïa, The latter is the first club from a bottom level to reach the final since 2005–06. CR Belouizdad achieved their eighth title in their history with a 2–0 win. Due to the difficult political conditions in Algeria and for the first time in the history of the Algerian cup final, the president of the country does not hand over the cup to the winning team, where he was handed over by the Minister of Youth and Sports Raouf Salim Bernaoui.

Route to the final

Pre-match

Details

Media coverage

References

External links
soccerway.com

Cup
Algerian Cup Finals